Tokuyama (written: 徳山, lit. "virtue mountain") is a Japanese surname. Notable people with the surname include:

, Japanese actor and singer
, born Chang-Soo Hong, South Korean boxer
, Japanese samurai
, Japanese singer

Japanese-language surnames